"Run for the Roses" is a song written and recorded by singer/songwriter Dan Fogelberg in 1980.

Background
The chorus mentions "the chance of a lifetime in a lifetime of chance", at once describing the experience of horse racing and life itself. The song has since been used as an unofficial theme for the Kentucky Derby.

Chart performance
Released as a single from the album The Innocent Age the following year, it peaked at number 18 on the Billboard Hot 100.

Popular culture
The song was commissioned by ABC for its telecast of the 106th running of the Derby in 1980, and  premiered on the network's Derby preview special the night before. Fogelberg stated that it was written in two days. The performance was broadcast from the Red Barn, the student activities building at the University of Louisville.

References

1980 songs
1981 singles
Kentucky Derby
Dan Fogelberg songs
Songs written by Dan Fogelberg
Songs about horses
Songs about Kentucky
Full Moon Records singles